Bill Brown may refer to:

Sportspeople
Bill Brown (linebacker) (born 1936), American football player in 1960 Boston Patriots season
Bill Brown (American football) (1938–2018), American football running back
Bill Brown (runner) (1925–2018), American relay runner
Bill Brown (outfielder) (1893–1965), American baseball player
Bill Brown (baseball coach) (born 1957), American college baseball coach
Bill Brown (basketball, born 1922) (1922–2007), American professional basketball player
Bill Brown (basketball, born 1951), American basketball coach at California University of Pennsylvania
Bill Brown (cricketer) (1912–2008), Australian cricketer
Bill Brown (footballer, born 1882) (1882–1949), Australian rules footballer for Geelong
Bill Brown (footballer, born 1902) (1902–1985), Scottish footballer
Bill Brown (footballer, born 1906) (1906–1981), Australian rules footballer for Hawthorn
Bill Brown (footballer, born 1914) (1914–1980), Australian rules footballer for Carlton and Collingwood
Bill Brown (footballer, born 1928) (1928–2010), English football (soccer) player
Bill Brown (footballer, born 1931) (1931–2004), Scottish international football (soccer) goalkeeper (Dundee, Tottenham Hotspur)
Bill Brown (footballer, born 1943), English football (soccer) player (Gillingham FC)
Bill Brown (NASCAR driver), retired NASCAR Cup Series driver who crashed with Larry Flynn
Bill Brown (sportscaster) (born 1947), American baseball broadcaster and member of the Texas Baseball Hall of Fame
Bill Brown (racewalker) (1878–1980), British Olympic racewalker

Politicians
Bill Brown (New Zealand politician) (1899–1967), New Zealand politician of the National Party
Bill Brown (American politician) (born 1944), Republican politician from Oklahoma
Bill Brown (Australian politician) (1920–2001), Australian senator

Others
Bill Brown (critical theory) (active since 1992), American author and professor of English at the University of Chicago
Bill Brown (composer) (born 1969), American composer
Bill Brown (filmmaker) (active since 1994), American filmmaker and author
Bill Brown (news anchor) (active 1982–2015), American morning news anchor for WJAC-TV
Bill Brown (rancher) (1855–1941), American rancher

See also
Billy Brown (disambiguation)
Brown (surname)
Will Brown (disambiguation)
William Brown (disambiguation)
Willie Brown (disambiguation)